William 'Bill' J Hobart (born 1948) is a former English international lawn and indoor bowler.

Bowls career
He was an English international from 1978 until 1985 (outdoors) and indoors until 1988.

Commonwealth Games
He represented England in the pairs, at the 1982 Commonwealth Games in Brisbane, Queensland, Australia.

National
He was runner-up in the 1976 National Championships.

Personal life
He was a director of a company supplying bowls equipment.

References

Living people
English male bowls players
1948 births
Bowls players at the 1982 Commonwealth Games
Commonwealth Games competitors for England